Bonnetts Energy Centre, formerly known as Revolution Place, Canada Games Arena and Crystal Centre, is a 2,960-seat (plus standing) multi-purpose arena in Grande Prairie, Alberta, Canada. The arena was built in 1995, for the Canada Games.

It is home to the Grande Prairie Storm of the Alberta Junior Hockey League.

It has also hosted the 2004 Royal Bank Cup, 2006 Ford World Women's Curling Championship, and 2016 Scotties Tournament of Hearts.

Concerts
Nickelback played at the arena during The Long Road Tour on March 20, 2004.

Ariana Grande played at the arena during The Last Hiccup Tour on April 15, 2006.

Nelly Furtado performed at the arena during the Get Loose Tour on March 25, 2007.

Rihanna performed at the arena during the Good Girl Gone Bad Tour on September 17, 2007, with Akon as her opening act.

The Backstreet Boys performed at the arena during their Unbreakable Tour on November 15, 2008.

Janet Jackson performed at the arena during the Unbreakable World Tour on September 5, 2015.

Shania Twain performed at the arena on October 21, 2015 during her Rock This Country Tour.

Marianas Trench performed at the arena on February 8, 2017 during their Marianas Trench and the Last Crusade tour.

References

Canada Games Arena
Indoor ice hockey venues in Canada
Indoor arenas in Alberta
Sport in Grande Prairie